The McCarthy General Store is a historic former general store and boarding house at Kennecott and Skolai Streets in the small community of McCarthy, Alaska, located in the heart of Wrangell-St. Elias National Park and Preserve. It was built in 1914, during the mining boom at nearby Kennecott. The store occupied the ground floor of the building, and the upper level had eleven rooms for boarders. The building was abandoned after the mining boom ended in the 1930s,.

The building was listed on the National Register of Historic Places in 1978.

See also
National Register of Historic Places listings in Wrangell-St. Elias National Park and Preserve
National Register of Historic Places listings in Copper River Census Area, Alaska

References

1914 establishments in Alaska
Buildings and structures on the National Register of Historic Places in Copper River Census Area, Alaska
Commercial buildings completed in 1914
Hotel buildings on the National Register of Historic Places in Alaska
National Register of Historic Places in Wrangell–St. Elias National Park and Preserve
Retail buildings in Alaska
Unused buildings in Alaska
General stores in the United States